Erlend Larsen  (born 13 October 1965) is a Norwegian pilot, non-fiction writer, and politician for the Conservative Party. He served as mayor in Stokke from 2011, and has been a representative to the Storting since 2017.

Personal life
Larsen was born in Stokke on 13 October 1965, a son of carpenter Einar Larsen  and gardener Jofrid Olga Larsen.

Career
Larsen worked as a pilot from 1994 to 2011. He has also written several non-fiction books, including books related to flying. From 2011 to 2016 he was mayor in Stokke.

He was elected representative to the Storting for the period 2017–2021 for the Conservative Party, and re-elected for the period 2021–2025.

References

1965 births
Living people
Conservative Party (Norway) politicians
Members of the Storting
Vestfold politicians